Ann Blades (born November 16, 1947) is a Canadian illustrator, writer and educator.

She was born in Vancouver, British Columbia. She earned a teaching certificate from the University of British Columbia in 1970. In 1974, she graduated in nursing from the British Columbia Institute of Technology. Blades taught school in a number of isolated communities in British Columbia.

Her first book Mary of Mile 18, published in 1971, received the Canadian Library Association Book of the Year for Children Award. It was followed by A Boy of Taché in 1973. Mary of Mile 18 was made into a film by the National Film Board of Canada. Her illustrations were included in an exhibition "Canada at Bologna" at the 1990 Bologna Children's Book Fair in Italy.

Selected works 
 The Cottage at Crescent Beach (1977)
 Jacques the Woodcutter (1977) text by Michael Macklem
 A Salmon for Simon (1978) text by Betty Waterton, received the Canada Council Children's Literature Prize
 Six Darn Cows (1980), text by Margaret Laurence
 Anna's Pet (1980) text by Margaret Atwood and Joyce Barkhouse
 Pettranella (1980) text by Betty Waterton
 By the Sea: An Alphabet Book (1985), won the Elizabeth Mrazik-Cleaver Canadian Picture Book Award
 Ida and the Wool Smugglers (1987) text by Sue Ann Alderson
 The Singing Basket (1990) retold by Kit Pearson
 A Ride for Martha (1993) text by Sue Ann Alderson
 A Dog Came Too (1993) text by Ainslee Martin
 Back to the Cabin (1996)
 Pond Seasons (1997) text by Sue Ann Alderson

References

External links 
 
 Archives of Ann Blades (Ann Blades fonds, R11708) are held at Library and Archives Canada

1947 births
Living people
Artists from Vancouver
Canadian children's book illustrators
Canadian women children's writers
Writers from Vancouver